Siwani may refer to:

Siwani, a city and a municipal committee in Bhiwani district in the north Indian state of Haryana
Ronald Siwani (1980–2013), South African cricketer